Laurence Boissier (12 August 1965 – 7 January 2022) was a Swiss writer, artist, and architect.

Biography
Boissier studied architectural engineering at the École des arts décoratifs de Genève. For two years, she worked for the International Committee of the Red Cross, visiting prisons in Serbia and South Africa. For ten years, she worked for the Canton of Geneva as an engineer in building physics.

She then studied at the Geneva University of Art and Design and earned an art degree in 2009. She wrote several collections of texts and a novel on non-conformity. In 2011, she joined , a group of German- and French-language Swiss writers. In 2017, she received a Swiss Literature Award.

Boissier died on 7 January 2022, at the age of 56.

Publications
Projet de salon pour Madame B. (2010)
Noces (2010)
Cahier des charges (2011)
Inventaire des lieux (2015)
Le maillot de bain orange (2016)
Inventaire des lieux (2017)
 (2017)
Safari (2019)
Histoire d'un soulèvement (2020)

Distinctions
New author grant from the Canton of Geneva (2009)
 (2009)
Swiss Literature Award (2017)
 (2018)
 (2018)

References

1965 births
2022 deaths
Swiss writers in French
20th-century Swiss women writers
21st-century Swiss women writers
Swiss women novelists
Writers from Geneva
Architects from Geneva
Geneva University of Art and Design alumni